= Mohamed Salah Zaki =

Egyptian footballer (born 2003)

Personal information
- Full name: Mohamed Salah Zaki
- Date of birth: 20 August 2003 (age 23)
- Position: Forward

Team information
- Current team: Zamalek

Senior career*
Years	Team	Apps	(Gls)
2024–	Zamalek		
- * Club domestic league appearances and goals

Mohamed Salah Zaki (Arabic: محمد صلاح زكي; born 20 August 2003) is an Egyptian professional footballer who plays as a forward for Egyptian Premier League club Zamalek.
